Trichopteryx fastuosa is a species of moth of the family Geometridae first described by Hiroshi Inoue in 1958. It is found in Taiwan.

The wingspan is 21–25 mm.

References

Moths described in 1958
Trichopterygini
Moths of Japan